Rossjapyx is a genus of diplurans in the family Japygidae.

Species
 Rossjapyx anodus (Silvestri, 1902)
 Rossjapyx australis Smith, 1962

References

Diplura